The Kadare Prize, established in 2015, is a literary prize awarded annually to a work by an Albanian author. It is named in honour of the Albanian writer Ismail Kadare. Winners are awarded 10,000 euros.

List of Winners

Winners

2018 
 Winner
 Virgjil Muçi for his novel Piramida e shpirtrave (Pyramid of Souls)

 Juria 
Kim Mehmeti (chair)
Genciana Abazi
Agim Baçi
Ledia Dushi
Eni Vasili

 Shortlist 
Vera Bekteshi - Një rrugë e gjatë pa krye
Virgjil Muci - Piramida e shpirtrave
Gazmend Krasniqi - Triologjia e Shkodrës
Rudina Cupi - Shenjat e pikësimit
Thanas Dino - Prishja ose Ndërrimi dhe ndalimi

2017 
 Winner
 Musa Ramadani for his novel “The Prophet from Prague”

 Jury 
Bashkim Shehu (chair)
Agim Baçi
Ylljet Aliçka
Ledia Dushi
Mirela Oktrova

 Shortlist

Musa Ramadani - “Profeti nga Praga”
Mimoza Ahmeti – “Tutori”
Ardian Haxhaj – “Vegim”

Virion Graçi – “800 hapa larg Veneres”
Arben Kastrati – “I dashuri unë”
Brajan Sukaj – “Viti i Elefantit”

The winner was announced on 28 May 2017 by Frédéric Mitterrand.

2016 
 Winner
 Shkëlqim Çela, for his “Embriologji” (Embriology).

 Jury 
Agim Baçi
Preç Zogaj
Diana Çuli
Ylljet Aliçka
Gilman Bakalli
Rudolf Marku
Alfred Lela

 Shortlist

Shkëlqim Çela - “Embriologji”
Bardhyl Londo - “Qyteti i pandehmave”
Grigor Banushi - “Simfonia e pambaruar”
Mustafa Nano - “Selam aleikum, baba”

Ada Çapi - “morPhina”
Arb Elo - “Ursa Major”
Pranvera Bekteshi - “Ora me rërë”

2015 
 Winner
 Rudolf Marku for his novel “Tri divorcet e zotit Viktor N.”

 Jury
Artur Zheji (kryetar jurie)
Gilman Bakalli
Gentian Çoçoli
Ylljet Aliçka
Alfred Lela
Preç Zogaj
Virgjil Muçi

 Shortlist
Arti Lushi, Eliona Gjergo, Gazmend Krasniqi, Ilir Bezhani, Primo Shllaku, Shkëlqim Çela, Zija Çela, Shefqet Tigani dhe Rudolf Marku

References

Fiction awards